The 2009 Abierto Internacional Varonil Club Casablanca was a professional tennis tournament played on outdoor red clay courts. It was part of the 2009 ATP Challenger Tour. It took place in Mexico City, Mexico between 13 and 18 April 2009.

Singles entrants

Seeds

Rankings are as of April 6, 2009.

Other entrants
The following players received wildcards into the singles main draw:
  Borut Puc
  César Ramírez
  Bruno Rodríguez

The following players received entry from the qualifying draw:
  Matthias Bachinger
  Marcel Felder
  Vincent Millot
  Dick Norman
  Niels Desein (as a Lucky loser)

Champions

Men's singles

 Dick Norman def.  Marcel Felder, 6–4, 6–7(6), 7–5

Men's doubles

 Sanchai Ratiwatana /  Sonchat Ratiwatana def.  Víctor Estrella /  João Souza, 6–3, 6–3

References
2009 Draws
Official website
ITF search 

Abierto Internacional Varonil Club Casablanca
Torneo Internacional Challenger León
2009 in Mexican tennis